Dai Shulun (732-789) was a Chinese poet of the mid-Tang period.

Biography 

Dai Shulun, born in 732, was a native of Jintan, Runzhou (in today's Jiangsu).  He served as a government official, however, in his later years, he was banished from the imperial court after the death of Emperor Daizong in 779. He then held various provincial positions, including  a stint as the governor of Fuzhou, Jiangxi and as the frontier commissioner (经略使, jinglue shi) of Rongzhou in Guangxi.  He was recalled ten years later back to the court, but died before he reached the capital in 789.

Works
Dai had ten collections of poetry published, but only two have survived to the present day. One of his poems was included in the important Qing-era anthology Three Hundred Tang Poems.

References

Bibliography

External links 
Books of the Quan Tangshi that include collected poems of Dai Shulun at the Chinese Text Project:
Book 268
Book 269

Tang dynasty poets
8th-century Chinese poets
Writers from Changzhou
Politicians from Changzhou
Tang dynasty politicians from Jiangsu
Poets from Jiangsu
Three Hundred Tang Poems poets